The Pune–Miraj–Londa line is an important railway line connecting Pune in Maharashtra and Londa in Karnataka. Of the total 468 km distance of this line, 280 km stretch falls under the jurisdiction of Central Railways and the remaining 188 km section under South Western Railway.

History

The Southern Maratha Railway (SMR) completed the metre-gauge Vasco–Guntakal railway line along with the branch from Londa to Pune in 1890. The metre gauge Miraj–Kolhapur railway line was opened for traffic on 21 April 1891. The  narrow-gauge line from Barsi Road to Pandharpur was extended to Miraj in 1927.

The Lonand–Phaltan branch line was completed by 2002.

Electrification

The electrification of the Pune–Miraj–Londa line is under progress as of 2022. The branch line Miraj–Kolhapur was electrified in 2019. The Pune–Miraj line was electrified in 2022. Miraj–Londa line electrification is in progress. The branch line Lonand–Phaltan is also being electrified.

Speed limit
The main-line and the branch lines are classified as 'Group D' lines, and the speeds are limited to 110 km/h.

Loco sheds
Pune diesel loco shed houses 175+ locos. These include WDM-2, WDM-3A, WDM-3D, WDG-3A, WDP-4D and WDG-4 locos. Pune trip shed houses WAP-4, WAP-5, WAP-7, WCAM-2/2P, WCAM-3 and WCAG-1 locos. Pune has one trip shed for WDS-4 shunters.

Major Stations
Major cities in Western Maharashtra such as Pune, Satara, Sangli and Miraj lie on the Pune–Miraj–Londa line while Kolhapur is connected by a branch line to Miraj. In Karnataka, Belgaum is the major city which lies on the Pune–Miraj–Londa line.

References

External links

5 ft 6 in gauge railways in India
Rail transport in Karnataka
Rail transport in Maharashtra